Mark Andrews (born September 6, 1995) is an American football tight end for the Baltimore Ravens of the National Football League (NFL). He played college football at Oklahoma and was drafted by the Ravens in the third round of the 2018 NFL Draft. Andrews has been elected to the Pro Bowl three times and was named to the 2021 All-Pro Team after setting the Ravens' single-season record for receptions and receiving yards.

Early years
Andrews was born in Scottsdale, Arizona to Paul and Martha Andrews.  His father is a urologist and his mother works in real estate. He has two brothers and a sister.
Andrews was diagnosed with Type 1 Diabetes when he was nine years old, but has been unhindered by the disease throughout his career.

Andrews attended Desert Mountain High School in Scottsdale, Arizona. He played wide receiver in high school and had 68 receptions for 1,122 yards and 17 touchdowns as a senior, 81 receptions for 1,494 yards and 21 touchdowns as a junior and 58 receptions for 1,058 yards and 10 touchdowns as a sophomore. His quarterback in high school was Kyle Allen. He held the Arizona high school record for career receptions, before Kade Warner, the son of Kurt Warner, broke his record. Andrews committed to the University of Oklahoma to play college football.

College career
Andrews switched from wide receiver to tight end at Oklahoma. After redshirting his first year in 2014, he played in all 13 games with one start in 2015 and had 19 receptions for 318 yards and seven touchdowns. In 2016, Andrews started 11 of 13 games, recording 31 receptions for 489 yards and seven touchdowns. He was the recipient of the 2017 John Mackey Award. In early January 2018, it was announced that Andrews would forgo his senior year at Oklahoma in favor of the 2018 NFL Draft.  Andrews finished his three years at Oklahoma with the sixth most touchdown receptions (22) by any receiver and had the most receiving yards (1,765) by a tight end.

Collegiate statistics

Professional career
On January 4, 2018, Andrews announced his decision to forgo his remaining eligibility and enter the 2018 NFL Draft. Andrews attended the NFL Scouting Combine in Indianapolis and completed all of the combine and positional drills. His overall performance was described as solid by scouts and analysts. On March 14, 2018, Andrews participated at Oklahoma's pro day, but chose to stand on his combine numbers and only performed positional drills. At the conclusion of the pre-draft process, Andrews was projected to be a second round pick by NFL draft experts and scouts. He was ranked as the fourth best tight end prospect in the draft by DraftScout.com, Scouts Inc., NFL analyst Mike Mayock, and Sports Illustrated.

The Baltimore Ravens selected Andrews in the third round (86th overall) of the 2018 NFL Draft. Andrews was the fourth tight end drafted in 2018 and was the second tight end drafted by the Ravens, after Hayden Hurst (25th overall).

On May 16, 2018, the Baltimore Ravens signed Andrews to a four-year, $3.45 million contract that includes a signing bonus of $836,660.

2018
Throughout training camp, Andrews competed to be a starting tight end against Hayden Hurst, Nick Boyle, and Maxx Williams. Head coach John Harbaugh named Andrews the fourth tight end to start the regular season, behind Hurst, Williams, and Boyle.

In the season opener against the Buffalo Bills, Andrews made his NFL debut and had three receptions for 31 yards in the 47–3 victory. On September 13, Andrews scored his first-career touchdown in the 23–34 loss to the Cincinnati Bengals.

Andrews closed out the 2018 regular season with 34 receptions for 552 yards and three touchdowns. He was responsible for two of the Ravens longest passing plays that season. The first was a 74-yard catch-and-run against the Oakland Raiders on November 25 and the second was a 68-yard touchdown against the Los Angeles Chargers on December 22. He led all rookie tight ends in receiving yards and finished third in receptions.

2019
In Week 1 against the Miami Dolphins, Andrews had eight catches for 108 yards and one touchdown as the Ravens won 59–10. In Week 2 against the Arizona Cardinals, Andrews caught eight passes for 112 yards and one touchdown as the Ravens won 23–17. In Week 16 against the Cleveland Browns, Andrews caught six passes for 93 yards and two touchdowns during the 31–15 win. Overall, Andrews finished the 2019 season with 64 receptions for 852 receiving yards and ten receiving touchdowns. His ten receiving touchdowns led the league among tight ends and tied with Cooper Kupp for second in the league among all positions. He was named to his first Pro Bowl for his efforts in the 2019 season.

2020
Andrews started the 2020 season off with five catches for 58 yards and two receiving touchdowns in the Ravens' 38–6 victory over the Cleveland Browns. In Week 3 against the Kansas City Chiefs, Andrews caught three of his eight targets and dropped a potential touchdown pass in the end zone during the 20–34 loss. Andrews rebounded in the following week’s game against the Washington Football Team, catching three passes for 57 yards and two touchdowns during the 31–17 win. In Week 11 against the Tennessee Titans, Andrews recorded five catches for 96 yards and a touchdown during the 24–30 overtime loss. He was placed on the reserve/COVID-19 list by the team on November 30, 2020, and activated on December 9. Andrews finished the 2020 season with 58 receptions for 701 receiving yards and seven receiving touchdowns.

2021

On September 6, 2021, the Ravens signed Andrews to a four-year, $56 million extension including $37.6 million guaranteed. In Week 3 against the Detroit Lions, Andrews had five receptions for 109 yards in a 19–17 comeback win. It was Andrews' first 100-yard game since Week 2 of the 2019 season. In Week 5 against the Indianapolis Colts, Andrews caught 11 of 13 targets for 147 yards and two touchdowns as well as two two-point conversion receptions (all career-highs), helping the Ravens to rally and win in overtime 31–25. Later that season, Andrews recorded three straight 100-yard receiving games between Weeks 14–16. In Week 14, Andrews recorded 11 receptions (tying his career-high from earlier in the season) for 115 yards and a touchdown in a 22–24 loss to the Cleveland Browns. The next week, he had 10 receptions for 136 yards and two touchdowns in a 30–31 loss to the Green Bay Packers. In Week 16, he had eight receptions for 125 yards and a touchdown in 21–41 loss to the Cincinnati Bengals.

Andrews would go on to finish the season setting a career high in receptions (107) and receiving yards (1,361) to go along with 9 receiving touchdowns in 17 games played. At the end of the season, Andrews was voted into his second Pro Bowl and was named First-team All-Pro by the Associated Press. He was ranked 32nd by his fellow players on the NFL Top 100 Players of 2022.

2022
Andrews entered the 2022 season as a full-time starter for the first time in his career. In a Week 2 38–42 loss to the Miami Dolphins, he had his first 100-yard receiving game of the season with nine receptions for 104 yards and a touchdown along with a three yard rush. The next week against the New England Patriots, he eight receptions for 89 yards and two touchdowns in the 37–26 win. Andrews recorded his second 100-yard performance in a Week 6 20–24 loss to the New York Giants, finishing the game with seven receptions for 106 yards and a touchdown.

NFL career statistics

Ravens franchise records
 Most single-season receiving yards: 1,361 (2021)
 Most receptions in a single season: 107 (2021)
 Most touchdown receptions by a tight end in a season: 10 (2019)
 Most receiving yards by a tight end in rookie season: 552 (2018) 
 Longest regular season reception by a tight end: 74 yds (2018)

Personal life
Because of his Type 1 diabetes, Andrews wears an insulin pump, except when he plays football. He serves as a spokesperson for those with diabetes and speaks with young people about its effects and ways to live with diabetes.

His brother Jack is a urologist, his sister Annie is a dentist, and his other brother, Charlie, works in real estate.

References

External links

Twitter
Baltimore Ravens bio
Oklahoma Sooners bio

1995 births
Living people
Players of American football from Scottsdale, Arizona
American football tight ends
Oklahoma Sooners football players
People with type 1 diabetes
All-American college football players
Baltimore Ravens players
American Conference Pro Bowl players
Ed Block Courage Award recipients